Michael David Veisor, Sr. (born August 25, 1952) is a Canadian former ice hockey goaltender. He played 139 games in the National Hockey League between 1973 and 1984. He was described as: "One of the most agile goaltenders around; plays goal like a trapeze artist."

Biography 
Veisor was born in Toronto, Ontario, Canada, and is Jewish. As a youth, he played in the 1963 Quebec International Pee-Wee Hockey Tournament with a minor ice hockey team from Toronto. He was drafted in Round 3 (#45 overall) in the 1972 NHL Amateur Draft. He started his National Hockey League career with the Chicago Black Hawks in 1973. He was the second Jewish goalie in NHL history.  He had wanted to be the first, but he was preceded by Ross Brooks.

He also played for the Hartford Whalers and Winnipeg Jets. He retired after the 1984 season.

Veisor currently works at Avon Old Farms School, in Avon, Connecticut, and is the rink manager. His son, Michael David Veisor, Jr., was drafted by the St. Louis Blues in the 1991 NHL Entry Draft (12th round, 263rd overall).  Mike, Jr. is a former college and minor-league goaltender, but he never played in the NHL.

Career statistics

Regular season and playoffs

Awards and honors

See also 
 List of select Jewish ice hockey players

References

External links 
 

1952 births
Living people
Binghamton Whalers players
Canadian ice hockey goaltenders
Chicago Blackhawks draft picks
Chicago Blackhawks players
Dallas Black Hawks players
Hamilton Red Wings (OHA) players
Hartford Whalers players
Jewish Canadian sportspeople
Jewish ice hockey players
Peterborough Petes (ice hockey) players
Sherbrooke Jets players
Ice hockey people from Toronto
Winnipeg Jets (1979–1996) players